= British International School in Gaza =

School in Gaza Strip, Palestine

- المدرسة البريطانية الدولية في غزة
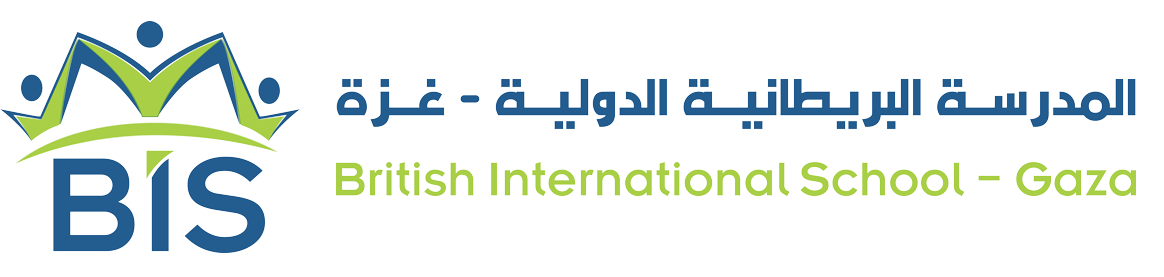

Location
- Tel Al Hawa, Gaza Strip; Palestine
- Coordinates: 31°21′16.9″N 34°18′31.4″E

Information
- Type: Private
- Gender: Co-educational
- Website: bis.edu.ps

British International School in Gaza (Arabic: المدرسة البريطانية الدولية في غزة) is a school located in Gaza, Palestine. It was founded in 2016, and offered an international curriculum for their students. Students could study for the British A-levels and American General Educational Development qualifications.

The school closed on October 7, 2023, due to the Gaza war.
